The 2000 Toyota Atlantic Championship season was contested over 12 rounds. The CART Toyota Atlantic Championship Drivers' Champion was Buddy Rice driving for PPI Motorsports. In this one-make formula all drivers had to utilize Swift chassis and Toyota engines. 20 different teams and 39 different drivers competed.

Calendar

Note:

Race 1 and 2 were held on combination oval/road course.

Final points standings

Driver

For every race the points were awarded: 20 points to the winner, 16 for runner-up, 14 for third place, 12 for fourth place, 10 for fifth place, 8 for sixth place, 6 seventh place, winding down to 1 point for 12th place. Lower placed drivers did not award points. Additional points were awarded to the pole winner (1 point) and to the driver leading the most laps (1 point).

Complete overview

R17=retired, but classified NS=did not start

See also
 2000 CART season
 2000 Indianapolis 500
 2000 Indy Racing League season
 2000 Indy Lights season

External links
 ChampCarStats.com

Atlantic
Atlantic Season, 2000
Atlantic Championship seasons
Atlantic